In mathematics an orthogonal trajectory is a curve, which intersects any curve of a given pencil of (planar) curves orthogonally.

For example, the orthogonal trajectories of a pencil of concentric circles are the lines through their common center (see diagram).

Suitable methods for the determination of orthogonal trajectories are provided by solving differential equations. The standard method establishes a first order ordinary differential equation and solves it by separation of variables. Both steps may be difficult or even impossible. In such cases one has to apply numerical methods.

Orthogonal trajectories are used in mathematics for example as curved coordinate systems (i.e. elliptic coordinates) or appear in physics as electric fields and their equipotential curves.

If the trajectory intersects the given curves by an arbitrary (but fixed) angle, one gets an isogonal trajectory.

Determination of the orthogonal trajectory

In cartesian coordinates 
Generally one assumes, that the pencil of curves is implicitly given by an equation
(0)  1. example  2. example 
where  is the parameter of the pencil. If the pencil is given explicitly by an equation , one can change the representation into an implicit one: . For the consideration below it is supposed that all necessary derivatives do exist.

Step 1.
Differentiating implicitly for  yields
(1)  in 1. example   2. example 
Step 2.
Now it is assumed, that equation (0) can be solved for parameter , which can thus be eliminated from equation (1). One gets the differential equation of first order
(2)  in 1. example  2. example  
which is fulfilled by the given pencil of curves.
Step 3.
Because the slope of the orthogonal trajectory at a point  is the negative multiplicative inverse of the slope of the given curve at this point, the orthogonal trajectory satisfies the differential equation of first order 
(3)   in 1. example  2. example 
Step 4.
This differential equation can (hopefully) be solved by a suitable method.

For both examples separation of variables is suitable. The solutions are: 
in example 1, the lines  and 
in example 2, the ellipses

In polar coordinates 
If the pencil of curves is represented implicitly in polar coordinates by
(0p) 
one determines, alike the cartesian case, the parameter free differential equation
(1p)  
(2p) 
of the pencil. The differential equation of the orthogonal trajectories is then (see Redheffer & Port p. 65, Heuser, p. 120)
(3p) 

Example: Cardioids:
(0p)  (in diagram: blue)
(1p)  
Elimination of  yields the differential equation of the given pencil:
(2p) 
Hence the differential equation of the orthogonal trajectories is:
(3p) 
After solving this differential equation by separation of variables one gets

which describes the pencil of cardioids (red in diagram), symmetric to the given pencil.

Isogonal trajectory 
A curve, which intersects any curve of a given pencil of (planar) curves by a fixed angle  is called isogonal trajectory.

Between the slope  of an isogonal trajectory and the slope  of the curve of the pencil at a point  the following relation holds:

For  one gets the condition for the orthogonal trajectory.

For the determination of the isogonal trajectory one has to adjust the 3. step of the instruction above:
3. step  (isog. traj.)
The differential equation of the isogonal trajectory is:
(3i) 

For the 1. example (concentric circles) and the angle  one gets 
(3i) 
This is a special kind of differential equation, which can be transformed by the substitution  into a differential equation, that can be solved by separation of variables. After reversing the substitution one gets the equation of the solution: 

Introducing polar coordinates leads to the simple equation

which describes logarithmic spirals (s. diagram).

Numerical methods 
In case that the differential equation of the trajectories can not be solved by theoretical methods, one has to solve it numerically, for example by Runge–Kutta methods.

See also 
Cassini oval
Confocal conic sections
Trajectory
Apollonian circles, pairs of families of circles that are all orthogonal to each other

References 
 A. Jeffrey: Advanced Engineering Mathematics, Hartcourt/Academic Press, 2002, p. 233.
S. B. Rao: Differential Equations, University Press, 1996, p. 95.
R. M. Redheffer, D. Port: Differential Equations: Theory and Applications, Jones & Bartlett, 1991, p. 63.
H. Heuser: Gewöhnliche Differentialgleichungen, Vieweg+Teubner, 2009, p. 120.
.

External links
 Exploring orthogonal trajectories - applet allowing user to draw families of curves and their orthogonal trajectories.
 mathcurve: FIELD LINES, ORTHOGONAL LINES, DOUBLE ORTHOGONAL SYSTEM

Curves